Acrossocheilus hemispinus is a species of ray-finned fish in the genus Acrossocheilus from Fujian and Zhejiang in China.

References

Hemispinus
Fish described in 1925